Watova is an unincorporated community and census-designated place (CDP) in Nowata County, Oklahoma, United States. It was first listed as a CDP prior to the 2020 census.

The CDP is in southern Nowata County, on the west side of U.S. Route 169, which leads north  to Nowata, the county seat, and south  to the outskirts of Tulsa.

Demographics

References 

Census-designated places in Nowata County, Oklahoma
Census-designated places in Oklahoma